Solute carrier family 22 (organic anion/cation transporter), member 12, also known as SLC22A12 and URAT1, is a protein which in humans is encoded by the SLC22A12 gene.

Function 
The protein encoded by this gene is a urate transporter and urate-anion exchanger which regulates the level of urate in the blood. This protein is an integral membrane protein primarily found in kidney. Two transcript variants encoding different isoforms have been found for this gene.

Clinical significance
Numerous single nucleotide polymorphisms of this gene are significantly associated with altered (increased or decreased) reabsorption of uric acid by the kidneys. Respectively, these altered rates of reabsorption contribute to hyperuricemia and hypouricemia.

Interactions 
SLC22A12 has been shown to interact with PDZK1.

Inhibition 
Lesinurad and dotinurad are urate transporter inhibitors that have been approved to treat gout. Lesinurad enhances urate excretion by inhibition the tubular re-absorption. Probenecid also facilitates uric acid secretion.

See also 
 Solute carrier family

References

Further reading 

 
 
 
 
 
 
 
 
 
 

Solute carrier family
Uric acid